Glòries is a station in the Barcelona Metro network, at the boundary between the Eixample and Sant Martí districts of Barcelona. It is served by TMB line L1. The station is named after the nearby Plaça de les Glòries Catalanes.

It was opened in 1951, when Line 1 was extended from Marina to Clot. It can be accessed from Carrer d'Àlaba and Glòries. It is currently being adapted for disabled people. It will be connected to a future train station in the square, which will include access to L8.

It is also an important tram station, being the terminus of Trambesòs tram routes T4 and T5.

See also
Plaça de les Glòries Catalanes
List of Barcelona Metro stations
List of tram stations in Barcelona

External links

Glòries at Trenscat.com

Railway stations in Spain opened in 1951
Barcelona Metro line 1 stations
Transport in Sant Martí (district)
Trambesòs stops